Marian Fountain "Minnie" Mortimer (born 1980) is an American fashion designer and socialite.

Early life
Born on Manhattan's Upper East side, Mortimer is the daughter of Senga Clark Mucci Davis and financier John Jay Mortimer, and the granddaughter of U.S. army colonel Henry Mucci. She was raised between Manhattan, Palm Beach and Southampton. She attended The Brearley School, Indian Mountain School, the Convent of the Sacred Heart, and St. Marks School, a boarding school in Southborough, Massachusetts. Mortimer studied photography in New York and worked with photographer Oberto Gili.  A member of the prominent Standard Oil family, Mortimer is the great-granddaughter of its president Henry Morgan Tilford. She is the daughter of Senga Mortimer, an editor at House Beautiful magazine, and John Jay Mortimer, a direct descendant of John Jay, the first Chief Justice of the United States.

Career
In 2009, Mortimer launched an eponymous woman's sportswear line with a feature in Vogue. Her designs have been featured in Marie Clair, InStyle, Elle, Vogue Nippon, Teen Vogue, Paper Magazine, The New York Times, Cosmopolitan, The Wall Street Journal, as well as others. She designed an exclusive collection for the W Hotels Global Glam line in the Fall of 2010. In the Spring of 2013, Mortimer designed a capsule collection for Three Dots U.S. and Three Dots Japan under the joint label "Minnie Mortimer for Three Dots." Mortimer frequently collaborates with and consults for the American heritage brand Boast USA producing several pieces under the label "Minnie Mortimer X Boast USA".

In addition to working as a designer and stylist Mortimer has appeared in the print and video advertising campaigns for Hogan and Ferragamo. She also appeared as herself in the WB show Gossip Girl.

Personal life
On May 19, 2007, she married the American Oscar and Emmy-winning filmmaker Stephen Gaghan.  They have two children.

In 2014, they listed their Brentwood home for sale for $4.995 million. In 2016, they were living in Pacific Palisades.

References

External links

Observer.com
Guestofaguest.com
Style.com
Elle
WWD.com

1980 births
Mortimer family of New York
Living people
Artists from New York City
American fashion designers
American women fashion designers
Schools of the Sacred Heart alumni
Convent of the Sacred Heart (NYC) alumni
Brearley School alumni
St. Mark's School (Massachusetts) alumni
People from the Upper East Side